"Wildflowers" is a song written by Greg Arnold and recorded by Australian folk-rock band Things of Stone and Wood. The song was released in August 1994 as the lead single from the band's second studio album Junk Theatre. "Wildflowers" peaked at number 41 on the ARIA Charts in September 1994.

The record label were resistant in releasing "Wildflowers" as the lead single due to the word Nazi in the song's chorus, but writer Greg Arnold insisted. The song became the most played Australian single on radio in October 1994.

In a review of the album, Jonathan Lewis from AllMusic said the song is commentary "on the rise of racism in Australia".

Track listing

Charts

References

1994 songs
1994 singles
Things of Stone and Wood songs
Songs written by Greg Arnold